John Gorton (died 1835) was an English writer, known as a compiler of reference works.

His works include:

 A translation of Voltaire's Dictionnaire Philosophique, 1824; 
 A General Biographical Dictionary (2 vols. 1828, with an appendix, 1830), new edition, with a supplement by Cyrus Redding, bringing the work as far as 1850, in 4 vols. 1851); 
 A Topographical Dictionary of Great Britain and Ireland, with Irish and Welsh articles by G. N. Wright, and  maps by S. Hall, 3 vols. 1831–3, first published in separate parts;
 A poem in blank verse, Tubal to Seba, the Negro Suicide, 1797; and 
 A pamphlet entitled ‘A Solution of that great Scriptural Difficulty the Genealogy of Jesus … with a treatise on the Fall of Adam.’

Notes

References

External links
 

Year of birth missing
1835 deaths
English writers
English male writers